A chelengk was a military decoration of the Ottoman Empire.

Turkish military award

Originally a çelenk was "a bird's feather which one attaches to the turban as a sign of bravery" but by the end of the 18th century, the  had become institutionalized in Ottoman military practice and continued to be awarded for military merit up to the 1820s. It was a jewelled aigrette consisting of a central flower with leaves and buds, and upward-facing rays.

Gifts to non-Turkish naval heroes

A specially-made chelengk was awarded to Horatio Nelson by Sultan Selim III in honour of the Battle of the Nile in 1798. This was the first time that a chelengk was conferred on a non-Ottoman. The usual seven rays were augmented to thirteen, as described in a contemporary letter:

Nelson's chelengk was bought by the Society for Nautical Research in 1929 following a national appeal and placed in the National Maritime Museum. It was stolen in 1951 by Taters Chatham and never recovered.

Selim III also gave a chelengk to Russian Admiral Fyodor Ushakov after the capture of Corfu from the French in 1799.

In literature

In Patrick O'Brian's Aubrey-Maturin series of novels, Captain Jack Aubrey is awarded a chelengk by the Sultan after capturing two rebel ships in The Ionian Mission. His chelengk was worn, like Nelson's, on his dress uniform hat and contained hidden clockwork, so that the diamond strands shimmered in the sun.

See also 
 Wreath

References

Sources
 
 

Military awards and decorations of the Ottoman Empire
Turkish words and phrases
Horatio Nelson
Award items
Turbans
Orders, decorations, and medals of the Ottoman Empire